This is a list of Italian football transfers featuring at least one Serie A or Serie B club which were completed from 1 July 2017 to 31 August 2017, date in which the summer transfer window would close. Free agent could join any club at any time.

Transfers
Legend
Those clubs in Italic indicate that the player already left the team on loan on this or the previous season or new signing that immediately left the club

February–May

June

July

August

September

Footnotes

References
General

Specific

Summer transfers
2017
Italian